Michael Wixey (born 4 June 1971) is a Welsh sport shooter. He competed in the men's trap event at the 2018 Commonwealth Games, winning the gold medal.

References

1971 births
Living people
Welsh male sport shooters
Place of birth missing (living people)
Shooters at the 2018 Commonwealth Games
Commonwealth Games gold medallists for Wales
Commonwealth Games medallists in shooting
British male sport shooters
Medallists at the 2018 Commonwealth Games